The discography of Sevyn Streeter, an American R&B recording artist, consists of one studio album, twelve singles, two EPs, and twenty-two music videos.

Studio albums

Extended plays

Singles

Guest appearances
"She Ain't You" (with Chris Brown) on F.A.M.E. (2011) 
"Party Hard / Cadillac (Interlude)", "	"Remember My Name" and "Touch Me"  (with Chris Brown) on Fortune (2012)
"John Doe (Remix)" (with B.o.B) (2013) 
"Swing My Way" (with B.o.B) on No Genre 2 (2014) 
"Love Life" (with B.o.B) on Psycadelik Thoughtz (2015) 
"Help Me" (with Puff Daddy) on MMM (Money Making Mitch) (2015)
"Flex" (with Ingrid) on Trill Feels (2016)
"From the Heart" (with Dave East) on Kairi Chanel (2016)
"Parachute" (with Chris Brown) (2017)
"Oh I" (with The Game, Jeremih and Young Thug) (2017)
"No Reason" (with N.O.R.E.) (2018)
"What About Us" (with Eric Bellinger) (2021)

Music videos

Writing credits
Writing credits taken from ArtistDirect website.

References 

Discographies of American artists
Rhythm and blues discographies